N54 may refer to:
 N54 (Long Island bus)
 BMW N54, an automobile engine 
 Governor Pack Road, in the Philippines
 N54 road (Ireland)